Augustine Okrah (born September 1993) is a Ghanaian footballer who plays as an attacking midfielder or a winger for Simba SC.

Honours
Asante Kotoko

 Ghana Premier League: 2011–12
 President's Cup: 2017

Al-Merrikh
Sudan Premier League: 2015
Sudan Cup: 2015 
Al-Hilal

 Sudan Premier League: 2017
 Sudan Cup runner up: 2017

Bechem United

 Ghana FA Cup runner up: 2021–22

Individual

 Ghana Premier League Top scorer: 2013–14
 Ghana Premier League Player of the Season: 2013–14

References

External links
  
  
  

1993 births
Living people
Association football forwards
BK Häcken players
Ghanaian footballers
Ghana Premier League players
Allsvenskan players
Ghana Premier League top scorers